Virgilio Anastacio Teixeira (born 11 August 1973) is a retired Dutch–Portuguese footballer of  Portuguese and Dutch descent and current assistant coach of FC Dordrecht.

Career
Teixeira is a defender who was born in The Hague and made his debut in professional football, being part of the ADO Den Haag squad in the 1992–93 season.

In December 2008 he was one of four players released by ADO Den Haag, alongside Tim De Meersman, Robin Faber and Samir El Moussaoui.

Post-retirement and coaching career
After retiring, Teixeira worked as an account manager from September 2010 to July 2012 at Stadio in the Foot & Teamwear department. In April 2014, he coached regional youth academy Brabant United's U15s. In June 2015, he was appointed head coach of NEC Nijmegen's U17s and in the following season, the U19s.

In the summer 2017, he took charge of the Jong-team of ADO Den Haag. He was also appointed assistant manager to Bert Konterman at Netherlands U20 national team. In September 2018, Teixeira temporarily took charge of Netherlands U20s in a game against England U20, due to the death of Bert Konterman's father. Teixeira won the game 3-1.

In December 2019, still in charge of Jong ADO Den Haag, Teixeira was promoted to assistant manager of the first team on an interim basis, after Edwin de Graaf was fired one week after head coach Alfons Groenendijk had resigned. It lasted until 24 December 2019, when Alan Pardew was appointed new head coach and brought his own staff with him.

On 24 June 2021 it was confirmed, that Teixeira would leave ADO to join FC Dordrecht as an assistant coach to manager Michele Santoni.

References

External links
Profiel en statistieken van Virgilio Teixeira

1973 births
Living people
Dutch footballers
Dutch football managers
ADO Den Haag players
RKC Waalwijk players
Footballers from The Hague
Dutch people of Portuguese descent
Portuguese people of Dutch descent
Portuguese expatriate footballers
Portuguese footballers
SVV Scheveningen players
Association football central defenders
NEC Nijmegen non-playing staff